Will Sullivan (born August 15, 1992) is an American retired basketball player. Sullivan usually plays as shooting guard or point guard and is known for his shooting and defensive capabilities.

Career
Sullivan played four seasons of college basketball with the Miami RedHawks.

In August 2015, he signed a one-year contract with Donar in the Dutch Basketball League (DBL). In his first professional season, Sullivan won the DBL championship with Donar.

References

External links
Miami RedHawks bio

1992 births
Living people
American expatriate basketball people in the Netherlands
Basketball players from Illinois
Donar (basketball club) players
Dutch Basketball League players
Miami RedHawks men's basketball players
American men's basketball players
Guards (basketball)